Adrienn Bende (born 25 June 1985) is a Hungarian racing driver and model.

Life

Model career 
Bende was born in Budapest, and was the winner of the Miss Universe Hungary contest in 2006, and one of the 20 semi-finalists of the Miss Universe 2006 contest from Los Angeles.

Racing career 
She is since 2011 race driver at the Lotus Ladies Cup in Lotus Elise. Bende's first racing team was ProexSport Kft, since 2014 she is a driver for Czollner Motorsport.

References

Living people
1985 births
Hungarian female models
Miss Universe 2006 contestants
Hungarian beauty pageant winners
Hungarian racing drivers
Kodolányi János University of Applied Sciences alumni
Models from Budapest